Elizabeth Brice (born Bessie S. Shaler; February 21, 1883 – January 25, 1965) was an American musical-comedy singer and dancer.

Biography
Brice was born Bessie S. Shaler in Findlay, Ohio, on February 21, 1883 to John Shaler and Fannie C. Wise. In March 1901, shortly after her 18th birthday, she married Fred J. Wilkinson in Essex, Ontario, Canada.

In the 1910s, Brice was the most frequent partner of Charles King, with whom she appeared in The Slim Princess, A Winsome Widow, Watch Your Step and Miss 1917. When they performed together in vaudeville they were known as Brice and King. Brice also appeared in other productions, for example the Ziegfeld Follies of 1913. During World War I she entertained the troops overseas. She was not related to Fanny Brice.

Brice lived in Queens in her retirement. She died in 1965, aged 82.

References

1883 births
1965 deaths
People from Findlay, Ohio
American female dancers
American women singers
Vaudeville performers
Ziegfeld girls
20th-century American dancers
20th-century American women
Victor Records artists
Columbia Records artists